The 1982 Cork Junior Hurling Championship was the 85th staging of the Cork Junior Hurling Championship since its establishment by the Cork County Board. The draw for the opening round fixtures took place on 31 January 1982. The championship ran from 12 September to 14 November 1982.

The final was played on 14 November 1982 at the Castlelyons Grounds between Castletownroche and Delaneys, in what was their first ever meeting in the final. Castletownroche won the match by 5-18 to 3-04 to claim their second championship title overall and a first title in 22 years.

Castletownroche's Dave Relihan was the championship's top scorer with 1-14.

Qualification

Results

Quarter-finals

 Delaneys received a bye in this round.

Semi-finals

Final

Championship statistics

Top scorers

Overall

In a single game

References

Cork Junior Hurling Championship
Cork Junior Hurling Championship